The British Academy Television Craft Award for Best Sound: Fiction is one of the categories presented by the British Academy of Film and Television Arts (BAFTA) within the British Academy Television Craft Awards, the craft awards were established in 2000 with their own, separate ceremony as a way to spotlight technical achievements, without being overshadowed by the main production categories.

Before splitting into two categories for sound in 1992, Best Sound: Fiction (Best Sound: Fiction/Entertainment from 1992 to 2012) and Best Sound: Factual, two categories were presented to recognize sound in television programming:
 From 1978 to 1991 Best Sound Supervisor was presented. 
 From 1978 to 1991 Best Film Sound was presented.

Winners and nominees

1970s
Best Sound Supervisor

Best Film Sound

1980sBest Sound SupervisorBest Film Sound1990sBest Sound SupervisorBest Film SoundBest Sound: Fiction2000s

2010s

2020sNote: The series that don't have recipients on the tables had Sound team''' credited as recipients for the award or nomination.

See also
 Primetime Emmy Award for Outstanding Sound Editing for a Comedy or Drama Series (One-Hour)
 Primetime Emmy Award for Outstanding Sound Mixing for a Comedy or Drama Series (One-Hour)
 Primetime Emmy Award for Outstanding Sound Editing for a Comedy or Drama Series (Half-Hour) and Animation
 Primetime Emmy Award for Outstanding Sound Mixing for a Comedy or Drama Series (Half-Hour) and Animation
 Primetime Emmy Award for Outstanding Sound Editing for a Limited Series, Movie, or Special
 Primetime Emmy Award for Outstanding Sound Mixing for a Limited Series or Movie

References

External links
 

Sound: Fiction